Chet's Choice is an album by trumpeter/vocalist Chet Baker which was recorded in 1985 and released on the Dutch Criss Cross Jazz label.

Reception 

The Allmusic review by Scott Yanow states "One of the best settings for trumpeter Chet Baker was when he was accompanied by a guitar-bass duo. ... This is one of Baker's better albums from his later period".

Track listing 
 "If I Should Lose You" (Ralph Rainger, Leo Robin) – 4:37
 "Sad Walk" (Bob Zieff) – 5:30
 "How Deep Is the Ocean?" (Irving Berlin) – 6:20
 "Doodlin'" (Horace Silver) – 4:48
 "My Foolish Heart" (Victor Young, Ned Washington) – 9:30 Bonus track on CD release
 "Conception" (Miles Davis) – 4:40
 "Love for Sale" (Cole Porter) – 9:08
 "Adriano" (Philip Catherine) – 4:02
 "Blues in the Closet" (Oscar Pettiford) – 6:36 Bonus track on CD release
 "Stella by Starlight" (Young, Washington) – 7:30 Bonus track on CD release

Personnel 
Chet Baker – trumpet, vocals
Philip Catherine – guitar
Hein van de Geijn (tracks 8–10), Jean-Louis Rassinfosse (tracks 1–7) – bass

References 

Chet Baker albums
1985 albums
Criss Cross Jazz albums